A nappe, in geology, is a complex recumbent fold system.

Nappe may also refer to:

 Nappe (water), in hydraulic engineering, a sheet of water flowing over a dam or similar structure
 Nappe, in geometry, either half of a double cone
 Orlando Nappe (c. 1931–2007), Argentine footballer

See also
 Nap (disambiguation)
 Nape (disambiguation)
 Napp (disambiguation)
 Nappage, in baking, a glazing technique